The three-streaked tchagra (Tchagra jamesi) is a species of bird in the family Malaconotidae, which is an uncommon resident of semi-desert regions in the eastern Afrotropics. The binomial of this bird commemorates the explorer Frank Linsly James, who also had the Frank James Memorial Hospital built in his honour.

Range and habitat
It is found in Ethiopia, Kenya, Somalia, South Sudan, Tanzania, and Uganda. Its natural habitats are dry savanna and subtropical or tropical dry shrubland.

Description
It is a small tchagra, measuring 16–17 cm from bill tip to tail tip. They are distinct from other tchagra species in having a narrow, black median stripe over the crown, without any superciliary stripe. In addition the tertials and rectrices are mouse-brown in colour.

Habits
The male displays by fripping the wings in flight, followed by a series of down-slurred whistles. They feed to a large extent on insects, but may in addition prey on chicks of other birds.

Races
There are two accepted races:
 T. j. jamesi (Shelley, 1885) – Uganda, Ethiopia, Somalia, inland Kenya and very locally in South Sudan and Tanzania
 T. j. mandanus (Neumann, 1903) – Kenyan coast and adjacent islands

References

three-streaked tchagra
Birds of the Horn of Africa
three-streaked tchagra
Taxonomy articles created by Polbot